On April 13, 1919, the Republic of China recognized the Provisional Government of the Republic of Korea. The Nationalist government of China participated in the Cairo Conference which resulted in the Cairo Declaration with the aim of freeing Korea and Taiwan from Japanese colonial rule. After the communist takeover of Mainland China in 1949 and the establishment of the Democratic People's Republic of Korea in 1948, relations between the two are non-existent, however, unofficial relations are significant.

Independence of the Democratic People's Republic of Korea and the Korean War 
The Japanese Empire had ruled Korea and Formosa, ended after World War II, which led the division of Korea, then followed by a period of trusteeship by Soviet occupation in the north as well as the retrocession of Taiwan and Penghu the months followed. Initially, China, who recognized the Korean Provisional Government, was adamantly opposed to Soviet influence in Korea after hearing about Soviet atrocities in Poland since its "liberation". By the Cairo Conference, the US and China came to agree on Korean independence "in due course", with China still pressing for immediate recognition of the exile government and a tangible date for independence. After Soviet-American relations deteriorated, on August 10, 1945 the United States Department of War agreed that China should land troops in Pusan, Korea from which to prevent a Soviet takeover. However, this turnaround was too late to prevent the division of Korea, as the Red Army quickly occupied northern Korea that same month. On 9 September 1948, the Democratic People's Republic of Korea (DPRK) was declared in the Soviet-occupied zone with Kim Il-sung as premier.

In 1949, the People's Republic of China (PRC) was proclaimed following the Chinese Civil War and the Republic of China (ROC), whose government relocated to Taiwan.

The United Nations condemned North Korea's military aggression against Republic of Korea in United Nations Security Council Resolution 82 and United Nations Security Council Resolution 84. The ROC voted in favor of both United Nations resolutions. During the Korean War, the ROC was an opponent of the DPRK while it supplied material aid to ROK, while the Red Chinese regime gave DPRK combatants to support the Red Chinese People's Volunteer Army.

Cold War years
The ROC had opposed socialism, as well as the Democratic People's Republic of Korea (DPRK) and People's Republic of China (PRC). Due to its hostility, the ROC has not recognized or formed a diplomatic relationship with the DPRK and PRC governments. Because of this, the government of the ROC also considered the Republic of Korea government as the sole legitimate state in the Korean peninsula. 

Both countries were in the opposite sides in the Vietnam War in which North Korea supported the North Vietnamese government while Nationalist China was allied with the South Vietnamese leadership.

Recent history 
Due to its status as a non-United Nations (UN) nation the ROC is not bound by UN sanctions against North Korea however the Taiwanese government has implemented a number of laws and regulations which mirror UN and US restrictions on trade with North Korea.

It has been reported that North Korea offered to sell Taiwan submarine designs in 2016. Taiwan's Ministry of National Defense has denied the reports saying "In the development of our submarines there has never been, there is not now and will never be any contact with North Korea; assistance is all provided by important countries in Europe and the United States."

ROC Premier Lai Ching-te approved a total ban on trade between the ROC and North Korea in September 2017. Taiwanese businessmen have been accused of selling coal, oil and gas to North Korea, as well as importing North Korean textiles and employing North Koreans on Taiwanese fishing vessels.

In 2018 United Nations (UN) investigators alleged that Taiwanese entities were engaged in transferring oil to North Korea in violation of UN sanctions.

In 2019 Taiwanese authorities indicted six people over ship-to-ship transfers of oil to North Korea.

In 2020 Taiwan reassured the United States that it was complying with UN sanctions again North Korea.

See also 
 South Korea–Taiwan relations
 Japanese colonial empire

References 

Korea, North
Taiwan